Melanie Klement (born 3 May 1994) is a Dutch professional racing cyclist, who currently rides for UCI Women's Continental Team .

References

External links

1994 births
Living people
Dutch female cyclists
Place of birth missing (living people)
20th-century Dutch women
21st-century Dutch women